is a city located in Tochigi Prefecture, Japan. ,  the city had an estimated population of 25,783 in 10,509 households, and a population density of 150 persons per km².

Geography
Nasukarasuyama is located in the center-eastern part of Tochigi Prefecture, at the western foot of the Yamizo Mountains, at the southern end of the Shiona Hills, and in the middle reaches of the  Naka River. The old Karasuyama town area is located on the right bank of the Naka River. The city is approximately 30 kilometers from the prefectural capital of Utsunomiya.  Nasukarasuyama is the political, economic, and administrative base city of the eastern part of the prefecture.
30–35 km northeast from the city of Utsunomiya, which is the prefectural capita

Surrounding municipalities
Tochigi Prefecture
 Sakura
 Nakagawa
 Takanezawa
 Ichikai
Ibaraki Prefecture
Hitachiōmiya

Climate
Nasukarasuyama has a Humid continental climate (Köppen Cfa) characterized by warm summers and cold winters with heavy snowfall.

Demographics
Per Japanese census data, the population of Nasukarasuyama has declined over the past 30 years.

History
The area began as a castle town for Karasuyama Domain in the Edo period, centered on Karasuyama Castle, a fortification dating to the Kamakura period. Karasuyama Town was established with the creation of the modern municipalities system on April 1, 1889. It merged with the neighboring villages of Mukada, Sakai, and Nanago on March 31, 1954. The modern city of Nasukarasuyama was established on October 1, 2005, from the merger of the towns of Karasuyama and Minaminasu (both from Nasu District).

Government
Nasukarasuyama has a mayor-council form of government with a directly elected mayor and a unicameral city assembly of 17 members. Nasukarasuyama, together with the town of Nakagawa a collectively contributes one member to the Tochigi Prefectural Assembly. In terms of national politics, the town is part of Tochigi 3rd district of the lower house of the Diet of Japan.

Economy
Nasukarasuyama has primarily an agricultural economy, with a secondary emphasis on tourism.

Education
Nasukarasuyama has five public primary schools and two public middle schools operated by the city government, and one public high school operated by the Tochigi Prefectural Board of Education.

Transportation

Railway
 JR East – Karasuyama Line
 -  -  -  -

Highway

Local attractions

Yamaage Kaikan
Karasuyama Castle

Sister City

Menomonie, Wisconsin, USA

References

External links

Official Website 

Cities in Tochigi Prefecture
Nasukarasuyama